The 12th Metro Manila Film Festival was held in 1986.

NCV productions' Halimaw sa Banga romped away 10 of the 12 awards given including the Best Director and Best Actor for Mario O'Hara - Banga Episode and Best Actress for Liza Lorena - Banga Episode among others. The film also garnered the Third Best Picture Award. Romy Vitug won the Best Cinematography Award for Celso Ad. Castillo's Payaso while the director's son, Chris Ad Castillo, received the Best Supporting Actor Award for Augusto Buenaventura's Bagets Gang.

Entries

Winners and nominees

Awards
Winners are listed first and highlighted in boldface.

Multiple awards

Ceremony Information

Gabi ng Parangal
The following are the key people during the "Gabi ng Parangal". 
Guest Speaker: Kris Aquino - representative of President Cory Aquino
Metro Manila Commission officer in charge and executive chairman of the 1986 MMFF - Joey Lina

Lack of Award categories
The 1986 Metro Manila Film Festival was considered the worst in the 12-year history of the annual 10-day festival of local movies. For the first time, it did not give out the traditional first and second Best Picture awards as well as the other two categories: Best Story and Best Screenplay. According to one of the jurors, Tingting Cojuangco stated: "No one of the seven entries deserved these awards..." He added that they: "...would like to express [their] concern over the current state of the Philippine movie industry as reflected in the entries to the year's MMFF...[The entries] failed to reinforce and inculcate positive Filipino values by portraying negative stereotypes, imitating foreign films and perpetuating commercially-oriented movies...".

Notes

References

External links

Metro Manila Film Festival
MMFF
MMFF